Java Road is a street in North Point on Hong Kong Island, Hong Kong. It runs from the junction of Electric Road and Tin Chong Street in Fortress Hill to meet King's Road in Quarry Bay, near .

History
Completed in 1933, the road was named after the Dutch shipping firm Koninklijke Java-China Paketvaart Lijnen (known outside the Netherlands as Royal Interocean Lines, RIL) — itself named for the island of Java in Indonesia (then Netherlands East Indies) — which had its operational headquarters there for much of the 20th Century. The company provided sea routes between Hong Kong, Shanghai, Jakarta, Medan, Surabaya, Makassar and elsewhere. The Chinese name of the road was originally . Java was the source of his sugar.

There was a Java Road Elementary School near the North Point Ferry Pier; it has since closed.

Features
Buildings along the street include:
 No. 99. Java Road Municipal Services Building. In the building, there is a market (from G/F to 1/F), the Java Road Cooked Food Centre (2/F), a sports centre with facilities including a basketball court, three squash courts, a dance room, children's soft play room, and an American pool room (from 3/F to 5/F).
 No. 222. Customs Headquarters Building
 No. 303. ICAC Building
 No. 333. North Point Government Offices

See also

 List of streets and roads in Hong Kong

References

North Point
Roads on Hong Kong Island